Iraq has had three vice presidents or deputy presidents serving concurrently.

The office of Vice President was historically largely ceremonial but prestigious. In post-war Iraq, the Constitution of Iraq, in its "Transitional Guidelines," creates a three-member presidency (or presidential) council, consisting of the president of Iraq and two deputy presidents, who must act in unison. The presidency council had three members to accommodate Iraq's three largest groups: Sunni Muslim Arabs, Shiite Muslim Arabs, and the mostly Sunni Kurds. As a unit, the Presidency Council was meant to symbolize the unity of the nation. This arrangement is required by the constitution to continue until the Council of Representatives, enters its second set of sessions. At this point, the Presidency Council would be replaced by a solitary President of the Republic, who would have only one deputy, the vice-president. In any case, the Presidency is appointed by the Council of Representatives. The three-member arrangement was a hold-over from the Iraqi Interim Government and the Iraqi Transitional Government.

In September 2014, three new vice presidents were elected: former prime ministers Nouri al-Maliki and Ayad Allawi and former speaker of Parliament Osama al-Nujaifi.

On August 11, 2015, the Council of Representatives approved the al Abadi government plan to abolish the posts of both vice president and deputy prime minister. Later, Osama al-Nujaifi filed a complaint against the decision, considering it to be against the Constitution. Also Nuri al-Maliki promised to cling to his post. On 10 October 2016, the three posts of vice president were restored by the Federal Supreme Court of Iraq which deemed their abolition unconstitutional. The three offices have been vacant since October 2, 2018.

List of officeholders

Under Iraqi Republic and Ba'athist Iraq

The Ba'athist regime of Ahmed Hassan al-Bakr and Saddam Hussein also used the office of Vice President. However, the post was not as influential as the Vice Chairmen of the Revolutionary Command Council. Vice Presidents were appointed at the discretion of the President.

Republic of Iraq since 2004

See also
List of current vice presidents

References 

 
Politics of Iraq
Government of Iraq
Iraq